High School Reunion may refer to:

"High School Reunion" (Yes, Dear episode)
Romy and Michele's High School Reunion
High School Reunion (TV series)
Class reunion